Yamanur is a village in the southern state of Karnataka, India. It is located in the Navalgund taluk of Dharwad district in Karnataka.

Demographics
As of the 2011 Census of India there were 441 households in Yamanur and a total population of 2,211 consisting of 1,114 males and 1,097 females. There were 242 children ages 0–6.

See also
 Dharwad
 Districts of Karnataka

References

External links
 http://Dharwad.nic.in/

Villages in Dharwad district